Tsakonian or Tsaconian (also Tzakonian or Tsakonic,  and Tsakonian:) is a highly divergent modern variety of Greek, spoken in the Tsakonian region of the Peloponnese, Greece. Tsakonian derives from Doric Greek, being its only extant variant. Although it is conventionally treated as a dialect of Greek, some compendia treat it as a separate language.
Tsakonian is critically endangered, with only a few hundred/thousand, mostly elderly, fluent speakers left. Although Tsakonian and standard Modern Greek are related, they are not mutually intelligible.

Etymology
The term Tsakonas or Tzakonas first emerges in the writings of Byzantine chroniclers who derive the ethnonym from a corruption of Lakonas, a Laconian/Lacedaemonian (Spartan)—a reference to the Doric roots of the Tsakonian language.

Geographic distribution

Tsakonian is found today in a group of mountain towns and villages slightly inland from the Argolic Gulf, although it was once spoken farther to the south and west as well as on the coasts of Laconia (ancient Sparta).

Geographical barriers to travel and communication kept the Tsakonians relatively isolated from the rest of Greece until the 19th century, although there was some trade between the coastal towns. The rise of mass education and improved travel beginning after the Greek War of Independence meant that fluent Tsakonian speakers were no longer as isolated from the rest of Greece. In addition, during the war, the Turkish army drove the Tsakonians east, and as a result, their de facto capital shifted from Prastos to Leonidio, further making the people significantly less isolated. There began a rapid decline from an estimated figure of some 200,000 fluent speakers to the present estimate of a speaker count between 200 and 1,000.

Since the introduction of electricity to all villages in Tsakonia by the late 1950s, Greek mass media can reach the most remote of areas and has profoundly affected the speech of younger speakers. Efforts to revive the language by teaching it in local schools do not seem to have had much success. Standard Modern Greek is the official language of government, commerce and education, and it is possible that the continued modernization of Tsakonia will lead to the language's disappearance sometime this century.

The area where the language is found today in some villages Tsakonia slopes of Parnon in the southern province of Kynouria, including the towns of Leonidio and Tyros and the villages of Melana, Agios Andreas, Vaskina, Prastos, Sitaina and Kastanitsa.

Official status
Tsakonian has no official status. Prayers and liturgies of the Greek Orthodox Church have been translated into Tsakonian, but the ancient Koine of the traditional church services is usually used as in other locations in Greece. Some teaching materials in Tsakonian for use in local schools have reportedly also been produced.

Subdialects
There are three subdialects of Tsakonian: Northern, Southern, and Propontis.

The Propontis dialect was spoken in what was formerly a Tsakonian colony on the Sea of Marmara (or Propontis; two villages near Gönen, Vatika and Havoutsi), whose members were resettled in Greece during the 1924 Population exchange between Greece and Turkey. Propontis Tsakonian appears to have died out around 1970, although it had already stopped being the primary language of its community after 1914 when they were internally exiled with other Greeks in the region due to the outbreak of World War I. Propontis Tsakonian was overall grammatically more conservative, but it was also influenced by the nearby Thracian dialects of Greek which were much closer to Standard Modern Greek. The emergence of the Propontis community is either dated to the 13th century settlement of Tsakonians by Emperor Michael VII, explicitly referenced by Byzantine George Pachymeres or around the time of the 1770 Orlov Revolt. For an example of the standardizing Thracian Greek influence, compare the Northern and Southern word for water, ύο (ýo, derived from Ancient Greek ) to Propontic νερέ and Standard νερό (neré, neró).

Of the two mainland dialects of Tsakonian, Southern Tsakonian is spoken in the villages of Melana, Prastos, Vaskina, Tiros, Leonidio, Pragmateftis and Sapounakeika, while Northern Tsakonian is found in Sitena and Kastanitsa. As early as 1971, it became difficult for researchers in the northern villages to find any informants who could offer more than "a few isolated words". The Northern villages were much more exposed to the rest of Greek society, and as a result, according to linguist Nick Nicholas, Northern Tsakonian experienced much heavier Standard Greek lexical and phonological influence, before it began to die out much faster than Southern Tsakonian. It is generally believed that Northern Tsakonian has been influenced by modern Greek and there are indeed some examples where Northern Tsakonian uses "more modern" vocabulary than its Southern counterpart. The principal difference between Northern and Southern Tsakonian is the loss of the intervocalic consonant /-l-/ which exists in Northern Tsakonian but is absent from Southern Tsakonian. According to Maxim L. Kisilier, professor of Modern Greek in the Saint Petersburg State University, the /-l-/ in Northern Tsakonian is unlikely to be an innovation influenced by Standard Modern Greek, and, as such, according to him, it's more likely that Southern Tsakonian changed instead.

There may have once been a fourth, Western, dialect of Tsakonian given the forms attested by Evliya Celebi in the 17th century.

Morphology

Another difference between Tsakonian and the common Demotic Greek dialect is its verb system – Tsakonian preserves different archaic forms, such as participial periphrasis for the present tense. Certain complementisers and other adverbial features present in the standard Modern Greek dialect are absent from Tsakonian, with the exception of the Modern που relativiser, which takes the form πφη in Tsakonian (note: traditional Tsakonian orthography uses the digraph πφ to represent aspirated ). Noun morphology is broadly similar to Standard Modern Greek, although Tsakonian tends to drop the nominative, final -ς (-s) from masculine nouns, thus Tsakonian ο τσχίφτα for Standard o τρίφτης (o tshífta/o tríftis: "grater").

Contact

There has always been contact with Koine Greek speakers and the language was affected by the neighboring Greek dialects. Additionally, there are some lexical borrowings from Arvanitika and Turkish. The core, base vocabulary remains recognizably Doric, although experts disagree on the extent to which other true Doricisms can be found. There are only a few hundred, mainly elderly true native speakers living, although a great many more can speak the language less than fluently.

Phonological history

Vowels
A  can appear as a reflex of Doric , in contexts where Attic had η  and Modern Greek has : αμέρα "day"  corresponding to Modern ημέρα  "day", κρέφτα "thief"  corresponding to Modern κλέφτης .
Ε  >  before vowels: e.g. βασιλλία  "king" < βασιλέα . This sound change is absent from Propontis Tsakonian. Minimal pairs example: εννία "nine"  from Ancient Greek ἐννέα VS νία  "one fem." from Ancient Greek μία. 
O occasionally  > : ου(ι)θί  < όφις  "snake", τθούμα  < στόμα  "mouth". Final  >  after coronals and front vowels: όνος  > όνε  "donkey", πόρος  > πόρε  "door", γραφτός  > γραφτέ  "written", χρέος  > χρίε , but λύκος  > λιούκο  "wolf" and θερμόν  > σχομό  "food".
Examples: λύκος  νύκτα  κρύπτων  τύ >    > λιούκο  "wolf" νιούτθα  "night" γκρζιούφου  "hide (participle)" εκιού  "you". As seen from the following equivalent words, <Υ> was never fronted in Propontis Tsakonian, but rather remained :  "wolf,  "night",  "you". Any minor divergences from this model can be attributed to either internal dialectal borrowings or to borrowings from other Hellenic languages such as Maniot Greek or Standard Modern Greek.
Ω  in Ancient Greek (Severe Doric ), regularly goes to : εζού  "I" Ancient Greek ἐγώ , αού  "say (participle)" < λαλών . This shift is absent from Propontis Tsakonian.

Consonants
Tsakonian in some words preserves the pre-classical Greek -sound, represented in some Ancient Greek texts by the digamma (ϝ). In Tsakonian, this sound has become a fricative : βάννε  "sheep", corresponding to Ancient ϝαμνός  (Attic ἀμνός).

Tsakonian has extensive changes triggered by palatalisation:
 >  : κύριος  > τζιούρη , occasionally : κεφάλι  > τσουφά 
 >  : αγγίζων  > αντζίχου 
 >  : πηγάδι  > κηγάδι 
 >  : τυρός  > κιουρέ , occasionally : τίποτα  > τσίπτα , πίτα  > πίτσα  
 >  : Μιχάλης  > Ν(ν)ιχάλη 
 >  : ανοίγων  > ανοίντου 
 >  : ηλιάζων  > λιάζου 
 >  : ρυάκι  > ρζάτζι . This sound appears to have been a fricative trill in the 19th century, and  survived latterly only in women's usage in Southern Tsakonian. A similar change occurred with palatalised  in Polish and Czech, whereas in other languages it went in the reverse.

Word-initial  > : *ράφων  > σχάφου 

Word-final  > , which reflects an earlier process in Laconian; in Tsakonian, it is a liaison phoneme: τίνος  > τσούνερ 

In Southern Tsakonian,  is deleted before back and central vowels: λόγος  > Northern λόγo , Southern όγo ; λούζων  > Northern λούκχου , Southern ούκχου ;

Occasionally  > , which appears to reflect an earlier process in Laconian, but in others  is retained though the word is absent in Standard Greek: θυγάτηρ  > σάτη , but Ancient θύων  (Modern equivalent: σφάζω ) > θύου 

Tsakonian avoids clusters, and reduces them to aspirated or prenasalised stops and affricates:
 > : δρύας, άνθρωπος, τράγος  > τσχούα, άτσχωπο, τσχάο 
 > : σπείρων, ιστός, επιάσθη, ασκός, ίσχων  > πφείρου, ιτθέ, εκιάτθε, ακχό, ίκχου 
 > : ομφαλός, γρονθία, ρύγχος  > απφαλέ, γροτθία, σχούκο 
 > : ξερός  > τσερέ 
 > : δάκτυλο, δεχθώ  > δάτθυλε, δετθού 
 after consonants often goes to : πλατύ, κλέφτης, γλώσσα, αχλάδες  > πρακιού, κρέφτα, γρούσα, αχράε 
 > : σκορπίος, άρτος, άρκα, πορδή  > κχομπίο, άντε, άγκα, πφούντα 

In the common verb ending -ζω,  >  : φωνάζων  > φωνιάντου  

 are added between vowels: μυία, κυανός  > μούζα, κουβάνε 

 often drop out between vowels: πόδας, τράγος  > πούα, τσχάο

Prosody

English translation
I had a bird in a cage and I kept it happy
I gave it sugar and wine-grapes
and from the great amount of grapes and their essence,
the nightingale got naughty [possibly means it got drunk] and escaped.
And its master now runs after it with the cage in his hands:
Come my bird back where you belong, come to your house
I will remove your old bells and buy you new ones.

Phonotactics
(The use of digraphs in tradition spelling tends to obscure this). For instance, ancient  "hard" goes to Tsakonian , where  can be considered a single phoneme; it is written traditionally with a trigraph as ατσχέ (=atskhe).

Grammar
Tsakonian has undergone considerable morphological changes: there is minimal case inflection.

The present and imperfect indicative in Tsakonian are formed with participles, like English but unlike the rest of Greek: Tsakonian ενεί αού, έμα αού "I am saying, I was saying" ≈ Greek ειμί λαλών, ήμην λαλών.
Ένει (Ení)=I am
Έσει (Esí)=you are
Έννι (Éni)=he/she/it is
Έμε (Éme)=we are
Έτθε (Éthe)=you are
Είνι (Íni)=they are
Έμα (Éma)=I was
Έσα (Ésa)=you were
Έκη (Éki)=he/she/it was
Έμαϊ (Émaï)=we were
Έτθαϊ (Éthaï)=you were
Ήγκιαϊ (Ígiaï)=they were
ένει φερήκχου (masculine) ένει φερήκχα (feminine) ένει φερήκχουντα (neuter) (feríkhou/feríkha/ferikhouda)=I bring
έσει φερήκχου (masculine) έσει φερήκχα (feminine) έσει φερήκχουντα (neuter) (feríkhou/feríkha/ferikhouda)=you bring
έννι φερήκχου (masculine) έννι φερήκχα (feminine) έννι φερήκχουντα (neuter) (feríkhou/feríkha/ferikhouda)=he/she/it brings
έμε φερήκχουντε (masculine, feminine) έμε φερήκχουντα (neuter) (feríkhude/feríkhuda)=we bring
έτθε φερήκχουντε (masculine, feminine) έτθε φερήκχουντα (neuter) (feríkhude/feríkhuda)=you bring
είνι φερήκχουντε (masculine, feminine) έμε φερήκχουντα (neuter) (feríkhude/feríkhuda)=they bring
Note: Participles change according to the gender of the subject of the sentence

Tsakonian has preserved the original inflection of the aorist indicative.
ενέγκα (enéga)=I brought
ενέντζερε (enédzere)=You brought
ενέντζε (enédze)=He/She/It brought
ενέγκαμε (enégame)=We brought
ενέγκατε (enégate)=You brought
ενέγκαϊ (enégaï)=They brought

Writing system
Traditionally, Tsakonian used the standard Greek alphabet, along with digraphs to represent certain sounds that either do not occur in Demotic Greek, or that do not commonly occur in combination with the same sounds as they do in Tsakonian. For example, the  sound, which does not occur in standard Greek, does occur in Tsakonian, and is spelled σχ (much like German sch). Another sound recalls Czech ř. Thanasis Costakis invented an orthography using dots, spiritus asper, and caron for use in his works, which has been used in his grammar and several other works. This is more like the Czech usage of hačeks (such as š). Lastly, unpalatalized n and l before a front vowel can be written double, to contrast with a palatalised single letter. (e.g. in Southern Tsakonian ένει  "I am", έννι  "he is" – the former corresponding to Northern Tsakonian έμι  and Standard Greek είμαι .)

Note: (K) is for the northern dialect of Kastanitsa and Sitaina, (Λ) and (L) for the southern which is spoken around Leonidio and Tyros.

Examples

See also
Tsakonia

Notes

References

Further reading
Blažek, Václav. "Glottochronological analysis of the Greek lexicon: Modern, Tsakonian, Old and Mycenaean Greek. In: Graeco-Latina Brunensia. 2010, vol. 15, iss. 1, pp. 17–35.

External links

Projet Homere (text sample and audio files)
Tsakonian Bibliography
The Lord's Prayer in Tsakonian (text sample)
Church Service in Tsakonian  (RealAudio)

Languages of Greece
Varieties of Modern Greek
Endangered Indo-European languages
Critically endangered languages
Tsakonia
Doric Greek